Arturo Nuvolari (7 July 1863 – 17 December 1938) was an Italian professional racing cyclist. He was the father of the motor and car racing ace Tazio Nuvolari. The highlight of his career was winning the silver medal at the 1893 Italian Road Racing Championship in Alessandria. His brother Giuseppe was a multiple champion in the Motor-paced racing discipline.

References 

1863 births
1938 deaths
Italian male cyclists
Road racing cyclists
Cyclists from the Province of Mantua